Terry Lynn Tautolo (born August 30, 1954) is a former American football linebacker who played nine seasons in the National Football League (NFL) for the Philadelphia Eagles, San Francisco 49ers, Detroit Lions and Miami Dolphins. He played college football at University of California, Los Angeles (UCLA) and was drafted in the 13th round of the 1976 NFL Draft.

On December 16, 2013, GQ.com's internet show "Casualties of the Gridiron" reported that Tautolo was homeless and involved in substance abuse. Tautolo's former teammates learned of his dire situation and put out a call for help. With the help of his former UCLA teammate Brent Boyd and head coach Dick Vermeil and the NFLPA, he turned his life around and currently works with special needs children.

References 

1954 births
Living people
American football linebackers
Detroit Lions players
Miami Dolphins players
Philadelphia Eagles players
San Francisco 49ers players
UCLA Bruins football players
Sportspeople from Corona, California
Players of American football from Long Beach, California
American sportspeople of Samoan descent